Veni Shankar Jha was an Indian educationist. He served as the director of public instruction of the Central Provinces and Berar and was the vice chancellor of Banaras Hindu University from 3 July 1956 to 6 April 1960. The Government of India awarded him Padma Bhushan, the third highest Indian civilian award, in 1971.

See also

 List of Vice-Chancellors of Banaras Hindu University

References

External links
 

Recipients of the Padma Bhushan in medicine
Year of birth missing
Year of death missing
Scholars from Madhya Pradesh
20th-century Indian educational theorists
Vice Chancellors of Banaras Hindu University